Mohammed Alaaeldin Abdelmotaal (Arabic:محمد علاء الدين) (born 20 February 1995) is a Qatari footballer. He currently plays for Al-Duhail as a right back.

Personal
Alaaeldin is of Egyptian descent .

References

External links
 

Qatari footballers
1994 births
Living people
Al-Rayyan SC players
Al-Duhail SC players
Qatari people of Egyptian descent
Naturalised citizens of Qatar
Qatar Stars League players
Qatari Second Division players
Association football fullbacks